Several Canadian naval ships have been named HMCS Athabaskan. All named for the Athabaskan people and destroyers.
First ship was British built, the other two in Canada.

 , later renumbered (DDE 219), was a Tribal-class destroyer commissioned in 1947. Scrapped 1970.
Remained in service longer than her three sister ships, and was paid off in March 2017.

Battle Honours
Arctic, 1943–44 – blockade patrols in North Atlantic
English Channel, 1944 – Operation Hostile and Operation Tunnel
Korea, 1950–53 – three tours by providing naval gunfire support operations off the Korean coastline
Gulf and Kuwait

References

External links
 Directorate of History and Heritage – HMCS Athabaskan 

Royal Canadian Navy ship names